The 18th Filipino Academy of Movie Arts and Sciences Awards Night was held in 1970 for the Outstanding Achievements for the year 1969. 

Pinagbuklod ng Langit by United Brothers Productions was a movie about the life and love story of then President Ferdinand Marcos and First Lady Imelda Marcos won the most awards with 8 wins including the FAMAS Award for Best Picture and Best Director for Eddie Garcia. Garcia also won the Best Supporting Actor Award for the movie Dugo ng Bayani.

Awards

Major Awards
Winners are listed first and highlighted with boldface.

Special Awardee

References

External links
FAMAS Awards 

FAMAS Award
FAMAS
FAMAS